Zipper Down is the fourth studio album from American rock band Eagles of Death Metal. It was released on October 2, 2015. The first single, "Complexity", was made available for streaming on Pitchfork Media's website in June 2015. The entire album was made available to stream in an exclusive by NPR on their website, on September 23, 2015. "Oh Girl", "I Love You All The Time" and "Complexity" were previously on Boots Electric's first album Honkey Kong and were remade for Zipper Down.

Songs
The album includes a cover of "Save a Prayer" by Duran Duran. The two bands played the song together on TFI Friday. Following the November 2015 Paris attacks, a Facebook campaign was launched to get the cover of "Save a Prayer" to no. 1. Duran Duran stated that they would donate all of their royalties from the cover to charity. The song ultimately peaked at number 53 for the chart dated the week after the attack.

Following Duran Duran's lead, Eagles of Death Metal announced that they would donate any publishing and mastering fees for covers of their song "I Love You All the Time" to charity, with Homme stating, "If you're a country artist, a DJ, death metal, it doesn't matter, cover that song and we'll donate the publishing." They challenged distribution platforms, including Amazon, iTunes, and Spotify, to donate any of their revenues from covers of the song to charity as well. To date, the artists who have covered the song in response include Florence and the Machine, Imagine Dragons, Jimmy Eat World, Kings of Leon, My Morning Jacket, and Matt Cameron of Pearl Jam.

Critical reception

Zipper Down received generally positive reviews from music critics. At Metacritic, which assigns a normalized rating out of 100 to reviews from mainstream critics, the album received an average score of 73, which indicates "generally favorable reviews", based on 14 reviews.

Track listing

Personnel

Eagles of Death Metal
 Jesse Hughes ("Boots Electric") – guitar, vocals, baritone guitar, bass, talk box
 Joshua Homme ("Baby Duck") – vocals, baritone guitar, drums, bass, guitar, duduk, knee slaps, organ, percussion, piano, slapstick, slides, talk box, trumpet

Technical personnel
 Joshua Homme – production, engineering
 Mark Rankin – mixing (at Pink Duck Studios)
 Gavin Lurssen – mastering (at Lurssen Mastering)
 Alain Johannes – recording ("Silverlake"), engineering
 Justin Smith – additional engineering
 Pete Martinez – additional engineering
 Eden Galindo – studio tech

Additional musicians
 Tuesday Cross – additional vocals
Matt Sweeney – additional guitar

Additional personnel
 Chapman Baehler – photography
 Danielle Beverage – design, layout
 Keef Patrick – artwork, design, illustrations
 Marc Pollack – management
 Brian Tomasini – management

Charts

References

2015 albums
Eagles of Death Metal albums
Albums produced by Josh Homme